La culpa de los padres is a Mexican telenovela produced by Televisa for Telesistema Mexicano in 1963.

Cast 
Silvia Derbez
Eduardo Fajardo
Enrique Aguilar
Sergio Márquez
Fernando Luján
Jana Kleinburg
Pilar Sen
Irma Lozano
Aurora Alvarado
Pituka de Foronda
Imelda Miller
Arturo Correa
Arturo Ferrer
Lilia Juáres
Luis Lara

References

External links 

Mexican telenovelas
1963 telenovelas
Televisa telenovelas
1963 Mexican television series debuts
1963 Mexican television series endings
Spanish-language telenovelas